The 2022 WNBA season was the 24th season for the Connecticut Sun franchise of the Women's National Basketball Association. It also was the 20th season for the franchise in Connecticut after relocating from Orlando. The season began on May 7, 2022, at the New York Liberty.

Despite losing their first game of the season, the Sun won their next four games in a row.  They then went 2–2 to finish out the month of May with a 6–3 record.  They started June with a four game winning streak and won six of their first seven games.  However, they lost three of their last four in the month to finish with a 7–4 record.  In July, the Sun won 3 of its first five, but then went on a four game winning streak.  The streak Chicago on the final day of the month.  They finished 7–3 in the month and secured a spot in the post season on July 28th.  The Sun went on a tear in August, only losing one game, to eventual #2 seed Chicago, and finished the month with a 5–1 record.  Their overall regular season record of 25–11 was one shy of tying a franchise record for wins.  They were the third seed in the playoffs, finishiLas Vegas and Chicago.  Brionna Jones was named the Sixth Player of the Year.

As the third seed they hosted a first round matchup against the sixth seeded Dallas.  The Sun won the first game in commanding fashion, 93–68.  However, they lost Game Two by ten points, forcing a Game Three in Dallas.  The Sun controlled the game and won by 15 points to advance to the Semifinals.  There they faced off against the second seeded Chicago Sky.  Connecticut won the first game by five points in Chicago.  They went on to lose games two and three and faced elimination in Game Four.  The Sun won game four by 24 points to force a Game Five in Chicago.  The Sun won by nine points and advanced to the 2022 WNBA Finals.  They faced off against the first seeded, Las Veagas Aces.  Las Vegas one the first two games in Connecticut, Game One by three points, and Game Two by fourteen.  The Sun won game three in Las Vegas by 29 points, but couldn't carry the momentum into Game Four losing by seven points.  The Aces won the series 3–1.

Transactions

WNBA Draft

Trades and Roster Changes

Roster

Schedule

Preseason

|- style="background:#bbffbb;"
| 1
| May 1
| Atlanta
| W 94–78
| Jonquel Jones (15)
| CarringtonB. Jones (6)
| Jasmine Thomas (5)
| Mohegan Sun3,244
| 1–0

Regular Season

|- style="background:#fcc;"
| 1
| May 7
| @ New York
| L 79–81
| Alyssa Thomas (25)
| A. ThomasJ. Jones (7)
| Natisha Hiedeman (6)
| Barclays Center6,829
| 0–1
|- style="background:#bbffbb;"
| 2
| May 14
| Los Angeles
| W 77–60
| Alyssa Thomas (23)
| Jonquel Jones (12)
| Alyssa Thomas (5)
| Mohegan Sun Arena5,624
| 1–1
|- style="background:#bbffbb;"
| 3
| May 17
| @ New York
| W 92–65
| DeWanna Bonner (16)
| J. JonesA. Thomas (6)
| BonnerHiedemanA. ThomasJ. Thomas (3)
| Barclays Center3,054
| 2–1
|- style="background:#bbffbb;"
| 4
| May 20
| Indiana
| W 94–85
| Jonquel Jones (19)
| Jonquel Jones (8)
| BonnerHiedeman (4)
| Mohegan Sun Arena4,428
| 3–1
|- style="background:#bbffbb;"
| 5
| May 22
| @ Indiana
| W 92–70
| B. JonesA. Thomas (18)
| Jonquel Jones (9)
| Alyssa Thomas (6)
| Gainbridge Fieldhouse2,612
| 4–1
|- style="background:#fcc;"
| 6
| May 24
| Dallas
| L 77–85
| B. JonesJ. JonesA. Thomas (13)
| Jonquel Jones (12)
| Alyssa Thomas (9)
| Mohegan Sun Arena4,180
| 4–2
|- style="background:#bbffbb;"
| 7
| May 26
| Dallas
| W 99–68
| DeWanna Bonner (18)
| Brionna Jones (7)
| Natisha Hiedeman (6)
| Mohegan Sun Arena4,308
| 5–2
|- style="background:#bbffbb;"
| 8
| May 28
| Washington
| W 79–71
| BonnerA. ThomasWilliams (14)
| Alyssa Thomas (10)
| Courtney Williams (7)
| Mohegan Sun Arena5,482
| 6–2
|- style="background:#fcc;"
| 9
| May 31
| @ Las Vegas
| L 81–89
| DeWanna Bonner (14)
| Jonquel Jones (13)
| Alyssa Thomas (6)
| Michelob Ultra Arena4,693
| 6–3
|-

|- style="background:#bbffbb;"
| 10
| June 2
| @ Las Vegas
| W 97–90
| Jonquel Jones (20)
| Alyssa Thomas (12)
| WilliamsHiedeman (6)
| Michelob Ultra Arena3,801
| 7–3
|- style="background:#bbffbb;"
| 11
| June 3
| @ Phoenix
| W 92–88
| Jonquel Jones (24)
| Alyssa Thomas (10)
| Alyssa Thomas (7)
| Footprint Center7,180
| 8–3
|- style="background:#bbffbb;"
| 12
| June 5
| @ Seattle
| W 93–86
| Jonquel Jones (25)
| Alyssa Thomas (11)
| Alyssa Thomas (12)
| Climate Pledge Arena11,330
| 9–3
|- style="background:#bbffbb;"
| 13
| June 8
| Indiana
| W 88–69
| Brionna Jones (18)
| B. JonesJ. JonesA. Thomas (9)
| Alyssa Thomas (5)
| Mohegan Sun Arena4,088
| 10–3
|- style="background:#fcc;"
| 14
| June 10
| Chicago
| L 79–83
| Brionna Jones (20)
| Jonquel Jones (14)
| Alyssa Thomas (8)
| Mohegan Sun Arena4,816
| 10–4
|- style="background:#bbffbb;"
| 15
| June 15
| Atlanta
| W 105–92
| Courtney Williams (20)
| Jonquel Jones (9)
| Alyssa Thomas (6)
| Mohegan Sun Arena4,014
| 11–4
|- style="background:#bbffbb;"
| 16
| June 17
| Seattle
| W 82–71
| DeWanna Bonner (20)
| Jonquel Jones (13)
| Alyssa Thomas (8)
| Mohegan Sun Arena7,088
| 12–4
|- style="background:#fcc;"
| 17
| June 19
| @ Washington
| L 63–71
| Jonquel Jones (15)
| Jonquel Jones (16)
| Alyssa Thomas (3)
| Entertainment and Sports Arena3,959
| 12–5
|- style="background:#fcc;"
| 18
| June 22
| New York
| L 77–81
| Courtney Williams (16)
| Jonquel Jones (11)
| Alyssa Thomas (5)
| Mohegan Sun Arena4,652
| 12–6
|- style="background:#bbffbb;"
| 19
| June 26
| @ Atlanta
| W 72–61
| Courtney Williams (17)
| Alyssa Thomas (11)
| Alyssa Thomas (8)
| Gateway Center Arena2,722
| 13–6
|- style="background:#fcc;"
| 20
| June 29
| @ Chicago
| L 83–91
| Jonquel Jones (24)
| Jonquel Jones (11)
| Natisha Hiedeman (7)
| Wintrust Arena6,709
| 13–7
|-

|- style="background:#bbffbb;"
| 21
| July 3
| Washington
| W 74–72 (OT)
| Alyssa Thomas (23)
| Alyssa Thomas (9)
| Natisha Hiedeman (5)
| Mohegan Sun Arena5,814
| 14–7
|- style="background:#fcc;"
| 22
| July 5
| @ Dallas
| L 71–82
| Courtney Williams (25)
| Jonquel Jones (7)
| Alyssa Thomas (6)
| College Park Center3,445
| 14–8
|- style="background:#bbffbb;"
| 23
| July 13
| @ Indiana
| W 89–81
| Jonquel Jones (20)
| Jonquel Jones (14)
| Alyssa Thomas (7)
| Indiana Farmers Coliseum3,212
| 15–8
|- style="background:#bbffbb;"
| 24
| July 15
| @ Atlanta
| W 93–68
| Jonquel Jones (21)
| B. JonesJ. JonesA. Thomas (6)
| Alyssa Thomas (5)
| Gateway Center Arena2,962
| 16–8
|- style="background:#fcc;"
| 25
| July 17
| Las Vegas
| L 83–91
| DeWanna Bonner (19)
| Alyssa Thomas (14)
| Alyssa Thomas (6)
| Mohegan Sun Arena6,814
| 16–9
|- style="background:#bbffbb;"
| 26
| July 19
| New York
| W 82–63
| Brionna Jones (21)
| Alyssa Thomas (13)
| Courtney Williams (6)
| Mohegan Sun Arena6,288
| 17–9
|- style="background:#bbffbb;"
| 27
| July 22
| @ Minnesota
| W 94–84
| DeWanna Bonner (20)
| Alyssa Thomas (10)
| Alyssa Thomas (12)
| Target Center8,321
| 18–9
|- style="background:#bbffbb;"
| 28
| July 24
| @ Minnesota
| W 86–79
| Natisha Hiedeman (19)
| Alyssa Thomas (10)
| DeWanna Bonner (8)
| Target Center7,231
| 19–9
|- style="background:#bbffbb;"
| 29
| July 28
| Seattle
| W 88–83
| Alyssa Thomas (19)
| DeWanna Bonner (10)
| Alyssa Thomas (11)
| Mohegan Sun Arena9,137
| 20–9
|- style="background:#fcc;"
| 30
| July 31
| Chicago
| L 92–95 (OT)
| DeWanna Bonner (23)
| BonnerB. Jones (9)
| Alyssa Thomas (8)
| Mohegan Sun Arena6,254
| 20–10
|-

|- style="background:#bbffbb;"
| 31
| August 2
| Phoenix
| W 87–63
| Natisha Hiedeman (16)
| Alyssa Thomas (12)
| Alyssa Thomas (10)
| Mohegan Sun Arena6,130
| 21–10
|- style="background:#bbffbb;"
| 32
| August 4
| Phoenix
| W 77–64
| Jonquel Jones (14)
| Alyssa Thomas (13)
| Alyssa Thomas (6)
| Mohegan Sun Arena6,215
| 22–10
|- style="background:#fcc;"
| 33
| August 7
| @ Chicago
| L 91–94
| DeWanna Bonner (18)
| Jonquel Jones (10)
| DeWanna Bonner (6)
| Wintrust Arena8,224
| 22–11
|- style="background:#bbffbb;"
| 34
| August 9
| @ Los Angeles
| W 97–71
| Jonquel Jones (21)
| Jonquel Jones (10)
| Alyssa Thomas (7)
| Crypto.com Arena5,789
| 23–11
|- style="background:#bbffbb;"
| 35
| August 11
| @ Los Angeles
| W 93–69
| Alyssa Thomas (18)
| Alyssa Thomas (9)
| DeWanna Bonner (7)
| Crypto.com Arena4,987
| 24–11
|- style="background:#bbffbb;"
| 36
| August 14
| Minnesota
| W 90–83
| Alyssa Thomas (16)
| Alyssa Thomas (7)
| HiedemanA. Thomas (5)
| Mohegan Sun Arena7,489
| 25–11
|-

Playoffs 

|- style="background:#cfc;"
| 1
| August 18
| Dallas
| W 93–68
| Jonquel Jones (19)
| Alyssa Thomas (10)
| Alyssa Thomas (7)
| Mohegan Sun Arena4,797
| 1–0
|- style="background:#fcc;"
| 2
| August 24
| Dallas
| L 79–89
| B. JonesJ. Jones (20)
| Jonquel Jones (9)
| Alyssa Thomas (5)
| Mohegan Sun Arena6,788
| 1–1
|- style="background:#cfc;"
| 3
| August 24
| @ Dallas
| W 73–58
| DeWanna Bonner (21)
| Jonquel Jones (10)
| DeWanna Bonner (5)
| College Park Center5,016
| 2–1

|- style="background:#cfc;"
| 1
| August 28
| @ Chicago
| W 68–63
| DeWanna Bonner (15)
| Alyssa Thomas (10)
| Alyssa Thomas (7)
| Wintrust Arena8,955
| 1–0
|- style="background:#fcc;"
| 2
| August 31
| @ Chicago
| L 77–85
| Jonquel Jones (23)
| Alyssa Thomas (10)
| Alyssa Thomas (4)
| Wintrust Arena8,311
| 1–1
|- style="background:#fcc;"
| 3
| September 4
| Chicago
| L 72–76
| DeWanna Bonner (18)
| Alyssa Thomas (13)
| Alyssa Thomas (7)
| Mohegan Sun Arena9,142
| 1–2
|- style="background:#cfc;"
| 4
| September 6
| Chicago
| W 104–80
| BonnerWilliams (19)
| Alyssa Thomas (8)
| Jonquel Jones (5)
| Mohegan Sun Arena5,868
| 2–2
|- style="background:#cfc;"
| 5
| September 8
| @ Chicago
| W 72–63
| BonnerJ. Jones (15)
| ThomasJ. Jones (10)
| Alyssa Thomas (8)
| Wintrust Arena8,014
| 3-2

|- style="background:#fcc;"
| 1
| September 11
| @ Las Vegas
| L 64–67
| Alyssa Thomas (19)
| Alyssa Thomas (11)
| BonnerA. Thomas (5)
| Michelob Ultra Arena10,135
| 0–1
|- style="background:#fcc;"
| 2
| September 13
| @ Las Vegas
| L 71–85
| Courtney Williams (18)
| Jonquel Jones (11)
| Courtney Williams (5)
| Michelob Ultra Arena10,211
| 0–2
|- style="background:#cfc;"
| 3
| September 15
| Las Vegas
| W 105–76
| Jonquel Jones (20)
| Alyssa Thomas (15)
| Alyssa Thomas (11)
| Mohegan Sun Arena8,745
| 1–2
|- style="background:#fcc;"
| 4
| September 18
| Las Vegas
| L 71–78
| Courtney Williams (17)
| Alyssa Thomas (10)
| Alyssa Thomas (11)
| Mohegan Sun Arena9,652
| 1–3
|-

Standings

Playoffs

Statistics

Regular Season

‡Waived/Released during the season
†Traded during the season
≠Acquired during the season

Playoffs

Awards and Honors

References

External links

Connecticut Sun at ESPN.com

Connecticut Sun seasons
Events in Uncasville, Connecticut
Connecticut
Connecticut Sun